Bull usually refers to an uncastrated adult male bovine.

Bull may also refer to:

Common meanings
 The adult male of many other species—see List of animal names
 Papal bull, a decree issued by the Pope
 "Bull", euphemistic shortening of the expletive "bullshit"

Arts and entertainment
 Bull (1965 film), a Bulgarian film
 Bull (2019 film), an American film
 Bull (2021 film), a British film
 Bull Hurley, a character in the Over the Top 1987 action drama film
 Bull (2000 TV series), a short-lived drama series on the TNT Network
 Bull (2015 TV series), a British comedy series on Gold
 Bull (2016 TV series), an American drama series on CBS
 "Bull" (CSI), a 2008 episode of television series CSI: Crime Scene Investigation
 Bull Shannon, bailiff in the Night Court TV sitcom
 Bull (album), a 1992 album by Bootsauce
 Bull, a dog in Japanese comic Lassie
 Bald Bull, an opponent in the video game Punch-Out!! Series

Military
 USS Bull, two U.S. Navy ships
 Bull, NATO reporting name of the Tupolev Tu-4, a Soviet bomber aircraft
 Bull (armored personnel carrier)

Names
 Bull (nickname)
 Bull (surname)
 Bull., standard author abbreviation of Jean Baptiste François Pierre Bulliard (c. 1742–1793), French physician and botanist
 Bull Buchanan, ring name of Barry Buchanan (born 1968), American wrestler
 Bull Curry, ring name of Fred Thomas Koury, Sr. (1913–1985), American professional wrestler
 Bull Nakano (born 1968), ring name of Japanese women's professional wrestler Keiko Nakano
 Bull Pain, American professional wrestler

Places
 Bull River (disambiguation)
 Bull Arm, Newfoundland, Canada, an arm or bay
 Bull Hill, a mountain in Putnam County, New York
 Bull Island, Dublin Bay, Ireland
 Bull Point, Falkland Islands
 Bull Point Lighthouse, Devon, UK
 Fort Bull, a fort in British North America during the French and Indian War

Other uses
 Groupe Bull, a French computer company
 Bull (stock market speculator)
 Bull baronets, an extant title in the Baronetage of the United Kingdom
 Bullet character entity, &bull; bullet character in HTML

See also
 Bull boat, a boat made by Native Americans and frontiersmen from the hide of a bull
 Bull Canyon (disambiguation)
 Bulla (disambiguation)
 Bulle (disambiguation)
 Bulls (disambiguation)
 The Bull (disambiguation)